Claude Birkett Ferenbaugh (1899–1975) was a United States Army lieutenant general. He served as the operations officer of the U.S. II Corps in Africa during World War II and commanded the 7th Infantry Division during the Korean War.

Early life and start of military career

Ferenbaugh was born in Dresden, New York, on March 16, 1899. He attended the United States Military Academy, graduating in 1918 and receiving his commission as a second lieutenant of infantry.

World War I

Having graduated from West Point in November, Ferenbaugh arrived in Europe too late to take part in World War I combat.  Like many other junior officers in the same circumstances, he carried out an observation tour of European battlefields, including visits to France, Belgium and Germany.

Post-World War I

Ferenbaugh remained in the Army after the war ended. He was a 1920 graduate of the Infantry Officer Basic Course, afterwards serving throughout the United States and overseas, including assignments at Fort Benning, Georgia, Vancouver, Washington, and in Hawaii and the Philippines. In 1932, Ferenbaugh graduated from the Signal School Command Officer Course. Ferenbaugh graduated from the Command and General Staff College in 1937, and from the Army War College in 1940.

World War II

After service on the General Staff at the War Department, in 1943 Ferenbaugh was assigned as operations officer, G-3 of the U.S. II Corps, and was responsible for planning and overseeing execution of combat actions during the North African Campaign. After his assignment with II Corps, Ferenbaugh served as assistant division commander of the 83rd Infantry Division.

Post-World War II

Ferenbaugh's service continued after World War II, including assignment as commander, of the Military District of Washington, chief of staff for the Operation Sandstone atomic tests, and commander at Schofield Barracks, Hawaii. He also served as president of the National Infantry Association in the late 1940s.

Korean War

In 1951, Ferenbaugh was named commander of the 7th Infantry Division. His assignment also included membership on the Allied Negotiating Team that negotiated peace terms with North Korea.

Post-Korean War

From July 1953 to December 1954, Ferenbaugh served as chief of staff for U.S. Army, Europe. In 1955, he returned to South Korea as deputy commander of the Eighth United States Army, remaining in this assignment until his 1958 retirement.

Awards and decorations

Ferenbaugh received multiple awards of the Distinguished Service Medal. He also received the Silver Star twice, the Legion of Merit three times, the Bronze Star twice, two awards of the Air Medal and the Purple Heart.

Retirement and death

In retirement, General Ferenbaugh resided in Washington, D.C. He died at his home on September 10, 1975, and was buried at Arlington National Cemetery, Section 7, Site 8083 A, RH.

References

External links

Generals of World War II

1899 births
1975 deaths
United States Army Infantry Branch personnel
United States Army personnel of World War I
United States Army personnel of the Korean War
United States Military Academy alumni
United States Army Command and General Staff College alumni
Recipients of the Distinguished Service Medal (US Army)
Recipients of the Silver Star
Recipients of the Legion of Merit
Recipients of the Air Medal
People from Dresden, Yates County, New York
People from Washington, D.C.
Burials at Arlington National Cemetery
United States Army generals of World War II
United States Army generals